Therioaphis is a genus of aphids in the family Aphididae. There are more than 20 described species in Therioaphis.

Species
These 25 species belong to the genus Therioaphis:

 Therioaphis aizenbergi
 Therioaphis alatina Hille Ris Lambers & van den Bosch, 1964
 Therioaphis arnaultae Remaudière, 1989
 Therioaphis astragali
 Therioaphis azerbaidjanica Remaudière, 1989
 Therioaphis beijingensis Zhang, 1982
 Therioaphis bonjeaniae Hille Ris Lambers & van den Bosch, 1964
 Therioaphis brachytricha Hille Ris Lambers & van den Bosch, 1964
 Therioaphis dorycnii (Pintera, 1956)
 Therioaphis hungarica Szelegiewicz, 1969
 Therioaphis kermanica Remaudière, 1989
 Therioaphis khayami Remaudière, 1989
 Therioaphis kundurensis Quednau, 2003
 Therioaphis langloisi Remaudière & Leclant, 1968
 Therioaphis litoralis Hille Ris Lambers & van den Bosch, 1964
 Therioaphis loti Hille Ris Lambers & van den Bosch, 1964
 Therioaphis luteola (Börner, 1949)
 Therioaphis  
 Therioaphis natricis Hille Ris Lambers & van den Bosch, 1964
 Therioaphis obscura Hille Ris Lambers & van den Bosch, 1964
 Therioaphis ononidis (Kaltenbach, 1846)
 Therioaphis pteromaculata Quednau, 2003
 Therioaphis riehmi (Börner, 1949) (sweet clover aphid)
 Therioaphis subalba Börner, 1949
 Therioaphis tenera (Aizenberg, 1956)
 Therioaphis trifolii (Monell, 1882) (yellow clover aphid)

References

Further reading

 
 

Articles created by Qbugbot
Sternorrhyncha genera
Panaphidini